The Ambassador of Australia to Ireland is an officer of the Australian Department of Foreign Affairs and Trade and the head of the Embassy of the Commonwealth of Australia to the Republic of Ireland in Dublin. Prior to the establishment of a resident embassy in Rome in 2008, on occasions the position has also had non-resident accreditation as Australia's Ambassador to the Holy See.

On 26 June 2020, the Australian Government announced the appointment of former Australian politician Gary Gray as Australia's ambassador to Ireland. Gray took up his office in August 2020 and presented his credentials to the President of Ireland on 25 September 2020.

Posting history

Formal diplomatic relations between Ireland and Australia were first established in 1945 by Taoiseach Éamon de Valera and Prime Minister Ben Chifley, with an agreement to exchange representatives. Ireland sent Thomas J. Kiernan as its first envoy to Australia on 15 October 1946, and on 9 April 1946 Australia announced the appointment of barrister William Dignam as High Commissioner in Dublin, who took up his appointment from 4 December 1946.

However, given Ireland's ambiguous status within the British Commonwealth after 1945, the title of the diplomatic postings and any letters of credence remained similarly ambiguous. In July 1945, when asked about whether he would make Ireland a republic, de Valera replied that "we are a republic", and the Irish government announced its unease with any wording that emphasised its connection with the Commonwealth. Therefore, although Keirnan was officially appointed to Australia as a "High Commissioner" (the standard title for representatives between members of the Commonwealth), De Valera signed the letters of credence to the Australian Governor-General with Keirnan's title as the "Minister Plenipotentiary Representative of Ireland to Australia". Keirnan's status was accepted and embraced by the Labor Party government in Canberra at the time, with the Minister for External Affairs, H. V. Evatt, having a good relationship with Keirnan. De Valera later accepted a compromise for the appointment of Dignam with credentials appointing him as the "Representative of Australia" and "Australian High Commissioner". Dignam arrived in Ireland in December 1946 and established the Australian High Commission at 62 Merrion Square in Dublin.

However, despite a promising early start to the relationship, issues arose once the Irish Government passed The Republic of Ireland Act 1948, which came into effect from 18 April 1949, and finally severed any last links between Ireland, the British monarchy, and the Commonwealth. With the replacement of Chifley's government with the conservative Liberal-Country Coalition government of Robert Menzies in December 1949, Dignam was soon recalled from Dublin in April 1950, and in September 1950 the two governments agreed to upgrade the two posts to the status of embassy. However, the new government nevertheless conveyed a greater degree of reluctance go any further, with new external affairs minister, Percy Spender, only agreeing to the appointment of a Chargé d'affaires (which did not require the exchange of official credentials) instead of an ambassador, with William Wynes taking up the appointment.

In April 1953, Minister for External Affairs Richard Casey announced the appointment of Paul McGuire as the first Australian Ambassador to Ireland, saying that the Department of External Affairs was "inadequate in sufficiently senior and experienced career personnel to fill all the Australian posts abroad," and that it was necessary to draw on experienced people from outside the department to fill some overseas posts. However, McGuire did not formally take up his post due to a protracted dispute between the Australian and Irish governments about the style of his credentials, with the Australian Government of the view that the term "Ireland" or "Republic of Ireland" ignored the status of Northern Ireland as part of the United Kingdom and implied a recognition of a united Ireland, and thus wanting for McGuire's title to be an "Ambassador to the Irish Republic" or "to Dublin", while the Irish Government wanted his title to be ambassador "to Ireland" or "to the President of the Republic of Ireland". No agreement was secured between the two governments. With the Australian Government of the view that the "cost of the post has not been warranted because of the small amount of diplomatic activity between Canberra and Dublin", Australia cancelled McGuire's appointment (he would later be appointed to Italy) and continued with the status quo of having a chargé d'affaires, with the Irish Government reciprocating in 1956 by withdrawing the designated ambassador since 1955, Brian Gallagher, and only appointing a resident chargé in Canberra.

The dispute was not resolved until 1964, when the two governments reached an agreement, with the Irish chargé, Dr Eoin MacWhite, appointed "Ambassador of Ireland to the Commonwealth of Australia" on 15 May 1964. This was followed by the Australian external affairs minister, Paul Hasluck, announcing the appointment of Hugh Roberton as the "Ambassador Extraordinary and Plenipotentiary for the Commonwealth of Australia", on 11 January 1965. Roberton presented his credentials to now-president De Valera in Dublin on 17 May 1965.

Since that time, the posting has reflected the growth in relations between Ireland and Australia, facilitating several state visits to Ireland, including 
Prime Minister Gough Whitlam in 1974, Governor-General Sir William Deane in 1999, and Prime Ministers Bob Hawke, Paul Keating and John Howard, who addressed the Dáil Éireann in 1987, 1993, and 2006, respectively.

The position has regularly been filled in the past by former politicians (including Gary Gray, John Herron, Brian Burke, Bob Halverson and Vince Gair). Brian Burke resigned from office in July 1991 following allegations of official corruption and the commencement of the WA Inc royal commission relating to his time as premier of Western Australia.

The 'Gair Affair'

On 1 April 1974, Democratic Labor Party (DLP) Senator and former Labor Party premier of Queensland, Vince Gair, was appointed ambassador by the Labor Party Government of Gough Whitlam, ostensibly in order improve the government's chances of winning an additional Queensland seat in the Senate at the following election. However, when Gair delayed his formal resignation, and the conservative Queensland Government confounded this scheme by issuing writs for five rather than six Senate places, the situation (known as the "Gair Affair") resulted in the opposition and the DLP trying to block supply. Whitlam responded to this by obtaining a double dissolution election in May 1974, which saw the government returned and the defeat of all DLP senators. Gair's term as ambassador proved to be short lived and just as tumultuous, with Gair being described as "not suited to diplomacy. He refused his officials' advice, antagonised the Irish Department of Foreign Affairs and his fellow heads of mission, [and] his inappropriate behaviour also led to the resignation of some female members of staff". Gair was never well-liked by the opposition Liberal-County Coalition, having been outspoken in his criticisms on domestic politics and the Liberal opposition, and when Whitlam's government was replaced by the Liberal Opposition in November 1975, Prime Minister Malcolm Fraser advised Gair that his appointment had been terminated and announced his recall on 21 January 1976.

List of heads of mission

Notes
 Also non-resident Ambassador of Australia to the Holy See.
 In April 1991, Burke resigned as ambassador with effect from 31 July 1991 in order to face a royal commission and was eventually jailed.

References

External links

Australian Embassy, Ireland

 
Ireland and the Commonwealth of Nations
Ireland
Australia